Birthorpe is a small hamlet in the South Kesteven district of Lincolnshire, England.

Birthorpe is regarded as a shrunken medieval village. The Manor House and farm house are listed buildings.

There was a substantial manor here well before 1300: the family who owned it took their name from the village. The most notable family member was Roger de Birthorpe (died c.1345), who had a distinguished career as a judge in Ireland, becoming Chief Baron of the Irish Exchequer in 1327. Roger was a somewhat controversial figure, who fled to Ireland after being outlawed for his part in a private war with Sempringham Priory, but eventually received a royal pardon. Birthorpe passed to the Deyncourt family in about 1345.

References

External links

    Location map of Birthorpe
Aerial view of Birthorpe

Hamlets in Lincolnshire
South Kesteven District